Yuri Petrovich Tavrov  was a Ukrainian actor. He is best known for his role as blacksmith Vakula in the movie Evenings on a Farm near Dykanka.

Biography 
Born July 2, 1938 in the village Luchyn Popilnia Raion in Zhytomyr region. Appeared in movies from 1961 to 1975. For family reasons, had to leave the film industry. After fourteen film career, working actor builder. Family life he had not been married twice. He lived in Odesa. He died a few years ago. Latest painter worked in the State Academy of Civil Engineering and Architecture.

Filmography
 1961 Vechera na khutore bliz Dikanki
 1970 Mezh vysokikh khlebov 
 1974 Proshchayte, faraony! 
 1975 Vesna dvadtsat devyatogo  
 1975 Port

References

External links
 Yuri Tavrov
 
 Yuri Tavrov

1938 births
People from Zhytomyr Oblast
20th-century Ukrainian male actors
Soviet male film actors
Soviet male voice actors
2010  deaths
Ukrainian male film actors